Tirana International Airport Nënë Tereza, often referred to as the Rinas International Airport, is one of the two main international airports of the Republic of Albania. It serves the city of Tirana, its metropolitan area, and surrounding region in the county of Tirana. The airport is named in honour of the Albanian Roman Catholic nun and missionary, Mother Teresa (1910–1997). It offers international connections primarily within Europe, with the most frequent routes to Milan, Rome, London and Istanbul.

The airport serves as the main hub for the country's flag carrier, Air Albania, and also for both Albawings and Wizz Air. The airport offers regularly scheduled passenger services, it is the largest and busiest airport in Albania and the seventh busiest Balkan airport. Albania's other main airport is Kukës International Airport located in the northeast of the country.

History

Early development 

The airport was constructed from 1955 to 1957. Tirana had commercial airline services before. Domestic aviation started in 1926 when German airline Adria-Aero-Lloyd obtained a monopoly for domestic air routes in the country and begin servicing Tirana, Shkodër, Korçë and Vlorë. These operations proved unprofitable, and the airline sold its rights to Italian company Ala Littoria which opened regular routes in 1935 between Tirana to Shkodër, Kukës, Peshkopia, Kuçova, Vlorë, and Gjirokastra. In 1938, the Yugoslav carrier Aeroput introduced regular commercial flights linking Tirana with Belgrade, Serbia with a landing in Dubrovnik, Croatia.

After the Second World War and installation of an isolationist communist regime in Albania, air transportation was rare. From 1944 to 1948 there was a service to Belgrade, but after the break of relations with Yugoslavia, until 1953, there was only a twice-a-month connection to Budapest operated by Soviet-Hungarian company Maszovlet. From 1953 to 1955 there was no air service, until February 1955 when a route to Moscow was inaugurated, followed thereafter to other Eastern-European capitals. In the 1970s, Tirana was one of the first European cities to be served by China's CAAC Airlines, with a weekly flight to Beijing via Bucharest and Tehran. In the late 1980s there were six airlines flying to Tirana, with a total of nine round-trips per week.

With the collapse of communism in Albania in 1991 and subsequent liberalisation of travel restrictions abroad for Albanians, the number of airlines operating at the airport increased rapidly. In 1999 there were 8,249 flights and 356,823 passengers, seven times more than in 1991.

Contemporary 
The air traffic equipment and facilities of the airport have been heavily modernised, following investments by Tirana International Airport SHPK, a consortium led by Hochtief AirPort. Hochtief assumed management of the airport on 23 April 2005, for a 20-year concession period.

The concession included the construction of a completely new passenger terminal and various infrastructure improvements, among them the construction of a new access road, new parking lots, and a bridge over the old airport access road. The expansion resulted in an increased number of passengers per annum, estimated at 1.5 million passengers for 2009. The number of passengers effectively increased to more than 1.5 million in 2010.

The terminal building and its second expansion, the cargo building, its landscaping, and its carpark canopies were designed by Malaysian architect Hin Tan of Hintan.

In December 2016, the Airport announced that it has served 2 million passengers during 2016, reaching its second milestone.

Ownership 

In 2017 China Everbright Limited became the sole owner of Tirana International Airport Nënë Tereza. After reaching an agreement with the Albanian Government to end its monopoly on international flights from Albania, Hochtief AirPort sold the operating of Tirana International Airport Nënë Tereza to China Everbright Limited, a company specializing in asset management, direct investment, brokerage and investment banking. On December 25, 2020, Kastrati Group bought all the shares of the airport from China Everbright Limited for 71 million euros.

Airlines and destinations 

The following airlines operate regular year-round and seasonal scheduled and charter flights to and from Tirana:

Statistics

Traffic

Busiest routes

Top carriers

Ground transport 

Taxis and car rental facilities are available at the airport. The journey from Tirana to the airport takes 20–25 minutes.

Bus 
An airport bus, located outside Arrivals terminal, leaves on the hour every hour (6am to 2am), to the city centre, and the trip takes around 30 minutes. The shuttle runs an hourly service between the Airport and the back of the Opera building in the centre of Tirana.

Incidents and accidents 
3 October 2006: Turkish Airlines Flight 1476, flying from Tirana to Istanbul, was hijacked by Hakan Ekinci in Greek airspace. The aircraft, with 107 passengers and six crew on board, transmitted two coded hijack signals which were picked up by the Greek air force; the flight was intercepted by military aircraft and landed safely at Brindisi, Italy.
30 June 2016: Three armed and masked people entered the cargo terminal, where they stole a huge amount of money that was to be transported abroad on airplanes. The amount of cash could have been up to 3 million euros. The incident caused national security concerns.
9 April 2019: An Austrian Airlines flight headed to Vienna was delayed for 3 hours, following an armed robbery. The aircraft's engines were running, when three men wearing masks and military fatigues stepped up to the fuselage, stealing 6 million euros. One of the robbers was shot dead in an exchange of fire with the police about one kilometre from the airport.

See also 
 Transport in Albania
 Economy of Albania
 List of airports in Albania
 Kukës International Airport
 Vlora International Airport

References

External links

Official Website

 

1957 establishments in Albania
Airports established in 1957
Airports in Albania
Buildings and structures in Durrës County
Memorials to Mother Teresa
Transport in Durrës County
Transport in Tirana
Airfields of the United States Army Air Forces Air Transport Command in the European Theater
China Everbright Group